The Galloping Gobs is a 1927 American silent Western film directed by Richard Thorpe and starring Jay Wilsey, Morgan Brown and Betty Baker.

Cast
 Jay Wilsey as Bill Corbitt 
 Morgan Brown as Chub Barnes 
 Betty Baker as Mary Whipple 
 Raye Hampton as Fanny 
 Walter Maly as The bandit leader 
 Robert Homans as The banker 
 Jack Barnell as The ensign 
 Fred Burns as The sheriff

References

External links
 

1927 films
1927 Western (genre) films
1920s English-language films
Films directed by Richard Thorpe
American black-and-white films
Pathé Exchange films
Silent American Western (genre) films
1920s American films